Retzius is a surname. Notable people with the surname include:

Anders Jahan Retzius (1742–1821), Swedish naturalist
Anders Retzius (1796–1860), Swedish anatomist; son of Anders Jahan Retzius
Gustaf Retzius (1842–1919), Swedish anatomist, liberal publicist; son of Anders Retzius

See also
Retropubic space, also known as "Retzius' space"
Striae of Retzius, named after Anders Retzius
Retzia, genus of plant in the family Stilbaceae; named after Anders Jahan Retius